Daejeon University is a private university located in Daejeon, South Korea. The current president is Lim Yong-Cheol (임용철). About 230 instructors are employed. The university also operates four Oriental medicine hospitals, two in Daejeon and the others in Chungju and Chunan.

History

The school first opened in 1981 as Daejeon College (대전대학). The affiliated Oriental medicine hospital was opened in the following year. The graduate school was opened in 1987, and the college became a university in 1988.

Academics
Undergraduate School 
College of Humanities & Arts 
College of International Languages & Culture
College of Law
College of Management
College of Engineering
College of Applied Industry
College of Health & Sports Science
College of Oriental Medicine

Graduate School
Graduate School of General
Graduate School of Management and Social Work
Graduate School of Business Information
Graduate School of Education
Graduate School of Health and Sports

Linkages
Daejeon University has strong links with ASEAN University Network, whereby jointly through ASEAN Exchange Student Program, both institutions aim to develop interregional friendship between the Republic of Korea and South East Asian countries. Up to 2012, there has been 10 batches of exchange students coming from South East Asian nations to study a wide array of subjects in Daejeon University. In 2012, there is a significant change in the exchange program that the program focuses only 5 nations: Cambodia, Philippines, Laos, Myanmar and Vietnam (CPLMV).

Notable alumni
Baek Bong-ki, actor
Oh Sang-uk, Olympic fencer

External links
 Official Website (Korean)
 Official Website (English)
 School Website 
 ASEAN University Network

See also
List of colleges and universities in South Korea
Education in South Korea

Universities and colleges in Daejeon
1979 establishments in South Korea
Educational institutions established in 1979